Constitution of 1994 may refer to:
Constitution of Abkhazia
Constitution of Argentina, reformed that year
Constitution of Belarus
Constitution of Belgium, reformed that year
1994 Constitution of Ethiopia
Constitution of Malawi
Constitution of Moldova (1994)
Constitution of the Dominican Republic
Republic of South Africa Constitution Act of 1994